Imhoffiella bheemlica is a bacterium from the genus of Imhoffiella which has been isolated from anoxic sediments from Bheemli in India.

References

External links
Type strain of Imhoffiella bheemlica at BacDive -  the Bacterial Diversity Metadatabase

Chromatiales
Bacteria described in 2007